This is a list of marae (Māori meeting grounds) in the Taranaki region of New Zealand.

In October 2020, the Government committed $7,407,008 from the Provincial Growth Fund to upgrade 23 marae in the region, with the intention of creating 305.5 jobs.

New Plymouth District

Stratford District

South Taranaki District

See also
 Lists of marae in New Zealand
 List of marae in Manawatu-Wanganui
 List of schools in Taranaki

References

Taranaki, List of marae in
Marae
Marae in Taranaki, List of